Wrightoporia lenta is a species of fungus in the family Bondarzewiaceae. First described as a species of Poria in 1946, Czech mycologist Zdeněk Pouzar transferred it to Wrightoporia in 1966.

References

External links

Russulales
Fungi described in 1946